Duty's Reward is a 1927 American silent drama film directed by Bertram Bracken and starring Alan Roscoe, Eva Novak and Lou Archer.

Cast
 Alan Roscoe as Richard Webster 
 Eva Novak as Dorothy Thompson
 Lou Archer as 'Peek' Harvey
 Eddie Brownell as Spencer Haynes 
 George Fawcett as James Thompson

References

Bibliography
 Robert B. Connelly. The Silents: Silent Feature Films, 1910-36, Volume 40, Issue 2. December Press, 1998.

External links
 

1927 films
1927 drama films
1920s English-language films
American silent feature films
Silent American drama films
American black-and-white films
Films directed by Bertram Bracken
1920s American films